The 2009–10 season of the Turkish Women's First Football League is the 14th season of Turkey's premier women's football league. Gazi Üniversitesispor is the champion of the season.

Season

Table

Results

External links
 Kadınlar 1. Ligi 2009 - 2010 Sezonu 

2009
2009–10 domestic women's association football leagues
Women's